Abuzariyeh may refer to:
 Abuzariyeh, Jiroft
 Abuzariyeh, Rudbar-e Jonubi